Rolf Beab (born 4 January 1964) is a retired German breaststroke swimmer who won one gold and one silver medal at the 1985 European Aquatics Championships. Between 1985 and 1988 he won four national titles in the 50 m and 100 m breaststroke events.

He is married to Susan; they have a son, Denis (b. 1984).

References

1964 births
Living people
German male swimmers
German male breaststroke swimmers
European Aquatics Championships medalists in swimming
People from Helmstedt
Sportspeople from Lower Saxony
20th-century German people